In the Romanian Orthodox Church, icons serve much the same purpose as they do in the rest of the worldwide Orthodox Church. The art of painting them has seen a revival after the end of the communist period, and today there are many active icon painters in Romania.

In Romania, icons painted as reversed images on glass and set in frames were common in the 19th century and are still made. "In the Transylvanian countryside, the expensive icons on panels imported from Moldavia, Wallachia, and Mt. Athos were gradually replaced by small, locally produced icons on glass, which were much less expensive and thus accessible to the Transylvanian peasants..." (Romanian Icons on Glass, Dancu, Juliana and Dumitru Dancu, Wayne State University Press, 1982).

See also
 Byzantium after Byzantium

Gallery of modern hand painted Romanian icons

Romanian art
Romanian Orthodox Church
Eastern Orthodox icons